The pectoral sandpiper (Calidris melanotos) is a small, migratory wader that breeds in North America and Asia, wintering in South America and Oceania. It eats small invertebrates. Its nest, a hole scraped in the ground and with a thick lining, is deep enough to protect its four eggs from the cool breezes of its breeding grounds.

Taxonomy
The pectoral sandpiper is sometimes separated with the "stint" sandpipers in Erolia. This may or may not represent a good monophyletic group, depending on the placement of the phylogenetically enigmatic curlew sandpiper ("C." ferruginea), the type species of Erolia. In any case, the genus name Ereunetes—formerly used for the western sandpiper ("C." mauri) and semipalmated sandpiper ("C." pusilla), which are also members of the stint clade—was established before Erolia.

"Cox's sandpiper" ("Calidris" × paramelanotos) is a stereotyped hybrid between this species and the curlew sandpiper. This does not prove a particularly close relationship between these two species, as far more distantly related waders have successfully hybridized. In any case, among the stint clade the red-necked stint ("C." ruficollis) and the long-toed stint ("C." subminuta) are particularly close relatives of the pectoral sandpiper.

The scientific name is from Ancient Greek. The genus name kalidris or skalidris, is a term used by Aristotle for some gray-colored waterside birds. The specific melanotos is from melas,  "black" and  notos, "backed ".

Description

This bird looks similar to the widely sympatric sharp-tailed sandpiper ("C." acuminata), which is not a member of the stint clade however. The pectoral sandpiper is a largish calidrid ( in length, with a wingspan of ) with a grey-brown back, brownest in the summer male, and grayest in winter. The pectoral sandpiper has a grey breast, sharply demarcated at its lower edge, which gives this species its English name; this clear dividing line is particularly conspicuous if the birds are turned towards the observer. The legs are yellowish, and the bill is olive with a darker tip.

The juveniles are more brightly patterned above with rufous coloration and white mantle stripes.

This species differs from the sharp-tailed sandpiper in its breast pattern, weaker supercilium and grayer crown.

Distribution and ecology

It is a very long-distance migrant, and about half of the species breeds in the boggy tundra of northeast Asia, the rest nesting in a range from Alaska to central Canada. The American and most of the Asian birds winter in South America, but some Asian breeders winter in southern and Australia and New Zealand. On migration and in winter, the pectoral sandpiper is typically found in freshwater habitats.

This species also occurs as a regular migrant to western Europe, and is seen most years in Ireland or Great Britain. While the pectoral sandpiper has not been recorded as breeding species in Europe, vagrant individuals were found in Scotland in suitable breeding habitat during summer. Many of the birds occurring in Western Europe may be on a regular migration from Asian breeding grounds to winter in Southern Africa. September 2003 saw a record influx to those two countries, with 40 found in Ireland and 150 in Great Britain. On the US Pacific coast, such stagings of migrant flocks appear to be rarer. Vagrant individuals are sometimes seen elsewhere off the usual migration routes, e.g. on the Marianas, the Marshall Islands and Palau in Micronesia; they are somewhat more frequently encountered on the Hawaiian Islands.

The pectoral sandpiper's migration might be affected by global warming, as is suspected for many Arctic-breeding birds: 100 years ago, migrating pectoral sandpipers were observed to pass through northern Ohio in early-mid May and again in late August; today, the bulk of the northward migration takes place in April already, and most birds do not return until mid-September.

These birds forage on grasslands and mudflats, picking up food by sight, sometimes by probing. They mainly eat arthropods (such as flies and their larvae, spiders and crustaceans) and other invertebrates, as well as seeds. The male has a courtship display which involves puffing up his breast, which has a fat sac in the breeding season to enhance his performance.

The pectoral sandpiper builds a steep-sided scrape nest with a considerable volume of lining material. The female lays four eggs.

Pectoral sandpipers have decreased in number 50% since 1974.

References

Further reading

External links

 
 
 
 
 
 
 
 

pectoral sandpiper
pectoral sandpiper
Birds of the Arctic
Native birds of Alaska
Birds of Canada
Birds of Hispaniola
Birds of the Dominican Republic
pectoral sandpiper
pectoral sandpiper